The 1922 Picardie mid-air collision took place on 7 April 1922 over Picardie, France, involving British and French passenger-carrying biplanes. The midair collision occurred in foggy conditions. A British aircraft flying from Croydon to Paris with only mail on board collided with a French aircraft flying three passengers from Paris to Croydon, which resulted in seven deaths.

Background
Following World War I, there was a steep decline in demand for military aircraft and their pilots. Like other countries, France and Britain turned to establishing a civilian air industry, initially converting military designs to domestic purposes.

The first Airco-designed aircraft for airline work after World War I was the de Havilland DH.18A.  One aircraft owned by the Air Ministry (registration G-EAWO), was transferred from Instone Air Line to Daimler Hire Limited for operation on the Croydon-Paris route until the three de Havilland DH.34s which Daimler had on order could be delivered. The service commenced that week on 2 April 1922.

The French company Compagnie des Grands Express Aériens (CGEA) was operating a Farman F.60 Goliath (registration F-GEAD) on a daily service from Le Bourget to Croydon.

The flight
On 7 April 1922, four days after Daimler Hire commenced operations with the DH.18A, G-EAWO was flying mail from Croydon bound for Le Bourget, Paris, with only the pilot (Lieutenant R. E. Duke) and a boy steward (Hesterman) aboard.  Meanwhile, the Goliath (F-GEAD) piloted by M. Mire had departed Le Bourget with three passengers and a mechanic. The three passengers were an American couple, Christopher Bruce Yule and the new Mrs. Mary Yule, who were on their honeymoon, and a French national, Monsieur Bouriez.

All seven people died in the first-ever mid-air collision between airliners.

The weather was misty with poor visibility. The two aircraft suddenly encountered each other in the mist, neither having time to take evasive action. During the collision the DH.18 lost a wing and the tail, and impacted first, with the Goliath crashing a few minutes later. Although people on the ground quickly reached the scene, all were found to be dead except for the boy steward, who was badly injured. He was taken to the nearby village, but died of his injuries. Early reports claimed the British pilot was the survivor.

Aftermath
Following the accident, a meeting was held at Croydon Airport by representatives of Compagnie des Grands Express Aériens, Compagnie des Messageries Aériennes, Daimler Airway, Handley Page Transport, Instone Air Line and KLM, as well as two representatives from the Air Ministry and various pilots employed by the companies. Among the resolutions passed at the meeting were that "keep to the right" was to become the universal rule of the air, new airliners should provide a clear view ahead for the pilot, and that all airliners should be equipped with radio. Clearly defined air routes were to be introduced in Belgium, France, the Netherlands and the United Kingdom.

See also
List of notable mid-air collisions
List of accidents and incidents involving commercial aircraft
October 1926 Air Union Blériot 155 crash – First mid-air fire on an airliner

References

Mid-air collisions
Mid-air collisions involving airliners
Aviation accidents and incidents in 1922
1922 in France
Aviation accidents and incidents in France
Aviation accidents and incidents involving fog
1922 disasters in France